Iosif Lengheriu (24 May 1914 – 11 September 1991) was a Romanian footballer and manager.

International career
Iosif Lengheriu played seven games at international level for Romania, making his debut in a friendly which ended with a 1–0 loss against Italy.

Honours

Player
Rapid București
Cupa României: 1936–37, 1937–38, 1938–39, 1939–40, 1940–41, 1941–42

Manager
Farul Constanța
Divizia B: 1957–58
Foresta Fălticeni
Cupa României runner-up: 1966–67

Notes

References

External links
Iosif Lengheriu player profile at Labtof.ro
Iosif Lengheriu manager profile at Labtof.ro

1914 births
1991 deaths
Romanian footballers
Romania international footballers
Association football midfielders
Liga I players
Liga II players
CSM Unirea Alba Iulia players
ACF Gloria Bistrița players
FC Rapid București players
Romanian football managers
FC Rapid București managers
FCV Farul Constanța managers
People from Alba County